Antonio DeShonta Smith (born October 21, 1981), nicknamed "the Ninja Assassin", is a former American football defensive end. He played college football at Oklahoma State, and was drafted by the Arizona Cardinals in the fifth round of the 2004 NFL Draft. Smith has also played Denver Broncos and Oakland Raiders and the Houston Texans.

College career
Smith played college football at Oklahoma State. He was an honorable mention All-Big 12 in his junior season at Oklahoma State.
Antonio played for NEO A&M College in Miami, Oklahoma during his freshman (2000) and sophomore (2001) season. He transferred to Oklahoma State for his junior (2002) and senior (2003) seasons.

Professional career

Arizona Cardinals
Smith was drafted 135th overall in the 2004 NFL Draft and was the starting left defensive end.
During the 2008 NFL Season, Smith played in every game and had 2 forced fumbles and 3.5 sacks. Smith helped the Cardinals reach Super Bowl XLIII, but the team would lose 27-23 to the Pittsburgh Steelers.
Despite a great performance during the course of the season, the Cardinals chose not to re-sign him and let him go into free agency.

Houston Texans
Smith was signed as an unrestricted free agent by the Houston Texans to replace the released Anthony Weaver.

In 2011, Smith went to his first career Pro Bowl, replacing the New England Patriots' Andre Carter who was unable to play due to injury.

In 2013, Smith was suspended for week one after an incident in the preseason in which he removed Miami Dolphins lineman Richie Incognito's helmet and swung it at him. On November 29, 2013, he was fined $15,750 for hitting Jacksonville Jaguars' quarterback Chad Henne in the head and neck region.

Oakland Raiders
On March 14, 2014, Smith signed a two-year, $9 million contract with the Oakland Raiders and played defensive tackle in the Raiders base 4-3 defense. He was released by the Raiders on March 31, 2015.

Denver Broncos
On April 2, 2015, Smith signed a one-year, $2 million contract with the Denver Broncos.

On February 7, 2016, Smith was part of the Broncos team that won Super Bowl 50. In the game, the Broncos defeated the Carolina Panthers by a score of 24–10.

Second stint with the Texans
On September 28, 2016, Smith was signed by the Texans.

NFL statistics

 
Key
 GP: games played
 COMB: combined tackles
 TOTAL: total tackles
 AST: assisted tackles
 SACK: sacks
 FF: forced fumbles
 FR: fumble recoveries
 FR YDS: fumble return yards 
 INT: interceptions
 IR YDS: interception return yards
 AVG IR: average interception return
 LNG: longest interception return
 TD: interceptions returned for touchdown
 PD: passes defensed

Personal life
Smith has two children, Antonio Smith Jr. (2003) and Winter Smith (2009).

Smith, along with his sister Antwonette, founded Smith's Little People With Big Challenges Foundation. The organization's mission is to fight childhood obesity.

Smith's father died 4 days before Super Bowl 50, due to heart surgery complications. Antonio Smith shares his knowledge and talent by volunteers his time as a defensive line coach for the Christian Heritage high school football team (Del City, OK). Which team is playing in 2018 Oklahoma state class A champion state final.

References

External links
Antonio Smith's foundation
Denver Broncos bio
Oakland Raiders bio
Houston Texans bio
Oklahoma State bio

1981 births
Living people
Sportspeople from Oklahoma City
Players of American football from Oklahoma
African-American players of American football
American football defensive ends
American football defensive tackles
Oklahoma State Cowboys football players
Arizona Cardinals players
Hamburg Sea Devils players
Houston Texans players
Oakland Raiders players
Denver Broncos players
American Conference Pro Bowl players
21st-century African-American sportspeople
20th-century African-American people